DYVE (89.7 FM), broadcasting as 89.7 RVFM, is a radio station owned and operated by Wave Network. The station's studio is located in Brgy. San Francisco, Borongan.

References

Radio stations established in 2012
Radio stations in Eastern Samar